Selam Tesfaye (born 17 October 1992) is an Ethiopian film actress. Her roles often placed her as a leading actress in various films. As recipient of multiple awards, notably Gumma Film Awards, she is one of the most popular icon in the Ethiopian film industry.

She had the lead role in the film Crumbs, directed by Miguel Llansó, and promoted as the first Ethiopian-made science-fiction film.

Early life 
Selam Tesfaye was born in a military camp  called "Tolay", in Harar, eastern Ethiopia. She moved to Humera and learnt from grade fourth to tenth there. During her relocation to Addis Ababa, she initially couldn't speak Amharic. Irrespective, she couraged to speak fluently in order to act in films. She frequently stated that she "prefers to role in films" rather than to perform other artistic professions.

Career
Selam entered  mainstream prominence in the 2013 film Sost Maezen (English: Triangle),  an international awarded action drama film. Furtherly, she took roles in many Ethiopian films, she also known for leading role in Hiwot Bedereja (2014), as a student who faces bullying by classmates. She additionally roles in romantic drama film Lik Negn (2013).

Selam also played as Sayat in 2015 science fiction film Crumbs. This film is the first sci-fi produced in Ethiopia and gained numerous accolades.

After 2016 saw her mass roles in films, which she also known by her portrayals in different romantic drama films notably, Seba Zetegn (2016) and Yimeches Yarada Lij 2 (2017). She is also known for the 2015 comedy film Tilefegn, starring with Kassahun Fesseha.

In 2017, Selam reprised to the sequel of Sost Maezen, Sost Maezen 2. In addition to that she also played in comedy films, such as Yabedech Yarada Lij 3 and Atse Mandela in that year.

Personal life
Selam has long relationship with Amanuel Tesfaye; both engaged and married in 2018. They have one child. In her wedding, she offered a bachelorette party with some fellow notable people presented. She currently resides with her mother in Addis Ababa.Selam Yesfaye and Amanuel Tesgaye separated 2022.

Awards
In September 2018, Selam won the Best Actress award at the 9th Addis Music Awards, for the film Yabedech Yarada Lij.

Filmography

References

External links

 Selam Tesfaye at Yageru

1992 births
Living people
Ethiopian film actresses
Ethiopian actresses
20th-century Ethiopian women
21st-century Ethiopian actresses
21st-century Ethiopian women
People from Harari Region
People from Tigray Region